Anatoliy Kyrylovych Yevdokymenko (20 January 1942 – 23 October 2002) was a Ukrainian musician, director of Chervona Ruta. He is a People's Artist of Ukraine, husband of Sofia Rotaru (marriage: 22 September 1968).

Graduated from the Physics and Mathematics department of the Chernivtsi University.

He was producer and scenario writer for most of concert programmes and tours of Sofia Rotaru.

In 2003, the street where he lived in Chernivtsi was named after his name.

Biography 
Yevdokymenko was born on 20 January 1942 in the village of Kapitanivka (now Lyman district of Odesa Oblast). He studied at the Chernivtsi secondary school of I-III degrees No. 3. In 1972, he graduated from the Faculty of Physics and Mathematics of Chernivtsi University. In 1982, he graduated from the Kyiv Institute of Culture.

In 1971–1977, he was an artist of the vocal-instrumental ensemble Chervona Ruta of the Chernivtsi Philharmonic.

Since 1971, he was artistic director and director of concert programs of Chervona Ruta. In 1977–2002, he was a soloist of the Crimean Philharmonic (Simferopol) where he performed pop arrangements of Ukrainian folk songs.

He was married to Ukrainina pop-singer and Chervona Ruta most popular singer Sofia Rotaru.

He died in Kyiv on 23 October 2002, and is buried at Baikove Cemetery.

References

External links
 Natalia Feshchyuk  «Trumpeter of the old plpace». Newspaper «Chernivtsi», No. 43. 2003.
 Sofia Rotaru & Anatoliy Evdokimenko 

1942 births
2002 deaths
Bulgarian-language singers
English-language singers from Ukraine
French-language singers of Ukraine
German-language singers
Italian-language singers
Polish-language singers
Romanian-language singers
Serbian-language singers
Soviet male singers
20th-century Ukrainian male singers
People from Odesa Oblast
Sopot International Song Festival winners
Chernivtsi University alumni
Recipients of the title of People's Artists of Ukraine
Burials at Baikove Cemetery